Rebecca Anne "Annie" January is a fictional superheroine in the comic book series The Boys, created by Garth Ennis and Darick Robertson. As Starlight, she is a member of the Seven, a group of superheroes funded by Vought-American (Vought International in the television franchise), and the love interest of Hughie Campbell. Annie is a former member of the Young Americans group with the ability of flight and light manipulation. Throughout the series, she is portrayed as one of the only members of the Seven with selfless, benevolent motivations, but becomes disillusioned when she sees the dark secrets of Vought and the other members of the Seven.

In the Amazon Prime Video streaming television adaptation and Seven on 7, Annie January / Starlight is played by Erin Moriarty, with Maya Misaljevic portraying a young Annie in the third season. The character is also represented via imagery in the anthology series The Boys Presents: Diabolical.

Appearances

Comic book series

Annie January / Starlight is introduced the latest member of the Seven. Her known powers are flight and the ability to project blinding light, though she is also hinted to have super-hearing. Formerly a member of the Young Americans superhero organization, and a conservative Christian. Upon joining the Seven, she is shocked to discover the other members' true nature. On her first visit, the Homelander requests that she perform oral sex for him, A-Train, and Black Noir, or leave the group, and she reluctantly complies. Her costume is modified against her will to be more revealing, and she has often been tricked into humiliating situations. It was claimed by A-Train in issue #20 that the Seven hired her solely to amuse themselves by degrading her; Jack from Jupiter expects her to be replaced by a bigger-name hero within a year. During the "Cherry" story arc, she meets Hughie in New York on a bench in Central Park. Under her Annie identity, she begins a relationship with Hughie, neither knowing the other's true identity.

Annie has frequently shown signs of changing, with aggressive outbursts, losing her faith, and using profanities and drinking alcohol. She shows some concern that she is becoming more like the rest of the Seven, coming to realize that even Homelander once shared her idealism. Butcher has footage of her induction into the Seven, and in issue #39, he discovers Annie's and Hughie's relationship.

In #32, Annie violently rejects a new, even more revealing costume and makeover and a new, fictional origin of being a rape victim foisted on her by VA's marketing department. The Seven's attempt to change her mind results in a staredown with Black Noir, with Annie only being saved by Maeve's surprise intervention. She further defies both the team and VA by going back to her original outfit.

Annie has said she believes her relationship with Hughie is "more precious than gold", and she intends to quit the Seven and move out. Despite this, #39–43 shows that she is terrified he will reject her if he finds out what she did to get into the Seven. This proves to be true, as Hughie flees when she reveals her true identity in Issue #45.

Not wanting the truth to destroy their relationship, she follows Hughie back to Scotland during the "Highland Laddie" mini-series. She reveals her childhood to Hughie, and what it was like growing up with powers: blinding her parents at birth, being adopted by a foster couple who raised her to show her off at VA pageants, and having powers while being forbidden to actually help or rescue people.

In issue #52, Hughie suggests to her that the relationship will not work despite his warnings about certain individuals not being keen on supes. She then explains to Hughie that he is the nicest person she ever had in her life and doesn't want to give that up, requesting that since the relationship is on the rocks, can he still treat her decently. Hughie agrees. In issue #55, after Hughie finishes his conversation with Mallory, he reveals to Annie that he has been working for the C.I.A. and wants her to leave the Seven and hide until the upcoming war between them and The Boys is at a conclusion. Hughie admits to her that he still loves her.

In issue #66, Annie leaves New York and Hughie behind due to the events following the attempted insurrection in Washington, as well as Hughie's continued discomfort around her. She returns in the final issue, with the characters once again together, having decided to give their relationship another shot now that both the Boys and the Seven are gone.

In the epilogue series, Dear Becky, which takes place a decade after the end of the series, Annie and Hughie get married and settle down in his hometown in Scotland.

Television series

In the television adaptation, Erin Moriarty portrays Annie January / Starlight, with Maya Misaljevic portraying a young Annie in the third season.

Season One (2019)

As a child, Annie's mother Donna (Ann Cusack) agreed to allow Vought to infuse her with Compound V after birth, but raised her to believe that her powers were a gift from God. Disagreeing with what happened to his daughter, Annie's father left, with her mother telling her that he had left after losing their savings through bad investments. Annie was raised a conservative Christian, an upbringing that continues to influence her, and attended superhero pageants as part of her mother's efforts to groom her as a candidate for membership in the Seven. By the first season, Annie is sexually assaulted by the Deep after being introduced as the newest member of the Seven. After preventing a rape and initially being reprimanded by Vought for doing so whilst out of costume, Annie is forced by Madelyn Stillwell (Elisabeth Shue) to wear a revealing costume supposedly representing female empowerment. After attending a Capes for Christ event, she begins questioning her faith when she witnesses its inherent homophobia, religious intolerance and opposition to premarital sex, eventually revealing the Deep's sexual assault on live television. She also enters a relationship with Hughie, with him finding out her identity as Starlight early on, though the relationship becomes strained when she learns of his involvement with The Boys and subsequently the truth about Compound V and its role in the creation of Supes.

Season Two (2020)

Annie becomes a spy for The Boys and helps them leak the truth of Compound V to the press. She continues her relationship with Hughie, but temporarily ends it out of fear of reprisal from Vought and Homelander should they learn of him. Stormfront and Homelander later catch her and imprison her for secretly aiding the Boys, but Hughie helps her escape. Despite her actions, Annie is pardoned by Vought and re-admitted to the Seven by the season finale, with the events of the season being blamed on Stormfront in light of her Nazi past being exposed. The first episode of the season depicts Annie as Starlight singing "Never Truly Vanish" at Translucent's televised funeral, with Erin Moriarty providing her own vocals for the recording.

Diabolical (2022)

While not personally appearing in The Boys Presents: Diabolical, imagery of Annie January / Starlight is used in promotional marketing produced by Vought International in the anthology series.

Season Three (2022)

One year after the events of season 2, Annie is appointed by Vought CEO Stan Edgar (Giancarlo Esposito) as the new co-captain of the Seven, partly to repair Vought's public image, partly to moderate Homelander's behavior. Hoping to use her new position to effect positive change and to recruit allies in a plot to kill Homelander, she is forced to abandon her plans and to accept a new public persona as Homelander's lover after he kills Supersonic, Annie's ex-boyfriend (formerly known as Drummer Boy). Annie becomes estranged from Hughie when he and Butcher take up use of Temp-V (a temporary version of Compound V) and partner with Soldier Boy (Jensen Ackles) against Homelander, with her allying with MM (who refused to take Temp-V and had a personal vendetta against Soldier Boy), Frenchie and Kimiko. After Homelander has Black Noir hide away Maeve, and Soldier Boy kills or severely injures most of the attendants at Herogasm whilst taking revenge against the TNT Twins, Annie makes an Instagram post with MM's help intended to ruin the public images of Homelander and Vought, and to alert the public of Soldier Boy's return, and retiring from her Starlight persona, saying: "I'm not Starlight anymore. My name is Annie January, and I fucking quit." 

This results in a smear campaign by Vought's news media wing, accusing her of being heartbroken after being dumped by Homelander, of being connected to the Shining Light Liberation Army (due to Kimiko), and of engaging in human trafficking via her charitable foundation Starlight House. She later infiltrates Seven Tower to obtain Compound V for Kimiko, where she manages to trick Homelander into confessing to Supersonic's murder, and also discovers that Temp-V will cause brain lesions and ultimately death after three to five doses. Annie frantically calls Butcher to warn Hughie as he is not returning her calls. After Butcher knocks Hughie unconscious and abandons him in a gas station bathroom, Annie picks him up, at which point he apologizes to her for not knowing what strength was and gives her permission to cathartically yell "I told you so" at him. Whilst fighting Soldier Boy at Seven Tower, Annie demonstrates a hitherto unknown ability to fly after Hughie turns up several studio lights to help her. After Soldier Boy is defeated, she bids a now-depowered Maggie Shaw goodbye, ceremonially throws her Starlight costume in the incinerator, and is officially welcomed as a member of the Boys.

Web series

Death Battle! (2020)
In the 2020 Amazon Prime Video-sponsored The Boys promotional episodes of Death Battle!, Starlight (voiced by Anna Chloe Moorey) participates and is killed in the Seven's battle royale.

Seven on 7 (2021–2022)
In the 2021–2022 promotional web series Vought News Network: Seven on 7 with Cameron Coleman, which bridges the events of the second and third seasons of The Boys, Annie and Hughie make their relationship public knowledge (a relationship which Vought anchor Cameron Coleman criticizes due to Hughie's new job working for Victoria Neuman) criticized, with Annie also filming promos for Vought's streaming service, Vought+.

Powers and abilities

As Starlight, Annie January possesses the ability to manipulate and draw power from nearby sources of electricity to generate, project and emanate blasts of energy and a blinding light from her hands. She has been shown to also possess a degree of super strength, the ability to withstand impact, even from ballistic weaponry, and she might possess a degree of super hearing. In the comic series, she also has the ability to fly and she is generally athletic as well as being a trained gymnast. Her light energy bursts are capable of blinding even super-powered beings.

Development

Annie's Starlight appearance, especially her original costume, is based on DC heroines Mary Marvel, whereas her powers are based on Marvel's Dazzler, who also can generate light and use it as both heat and concussive force.

Garth Ennis has stated that Annie's relationship with Hughie Campbell and subsequent characterisation in the comic series was not originally planned, saying that:

"Annie started out as a joke, and was actually going to degenerate further in terms of the shit she'd put up with, the degradations she'd suffer just to be in the world's premier super team. But I found myself writing Hughie moping in Central Park, and then to my great surprise I saw Annie coming walking down the path. That was when I realized I wanted to take her in a different direction, make her stronger and more rounded... I probably felt a bit guilty about Annie and ended up treating her a bit more responsibly as a result."

Reception
For her portrayal of Annie January / Starlight on The Boys television adaptation, Erin Moriarty was nominated for a Saturn Award for Best Performance by a Younger Actor in a Television Series.

References

American female characters in television
The Boys characters
DC Comics American superheroes
Characters created by Garth Ennis
Comics characters introduced in 2006
DC Comics characters with accelerated healing
DC Comics characters with superhuman strength
Dynamite Entertainment characters
Parody superheroes
DC Comics female superheroes
DC Comics female characters
Fictional characters from Iowa
Fictional characters who can manipulate light
Fictional characters with electric or magnetic abilities
Fictional characters with nuclear or radiation abilities
Fictional victims of sexual assault
Fictional characters with post-traumatic stress disorder
Fictional characters with bulimia
Fictional characters with eating disorders
Fictional double agents
Superhero television characters
Superheroes with alter egos
WildStorm superheroes